Lat Mahalleh may refer to:
 Lat Mahalleh, Gilan
 Lat Mahalleh, Amlash, Gilan Province
 Lat Mahalleh, Mazandaran